was a politician and bureaucrat in the early Shōwa period Japan, who subsequently was a politician and cabinet minister in the immediate post-war era.

Biography
Uehara was born in what is now the city of Azumino, Nagano. He lost his parents when he was three years old. After working for a silk mill, and the Yokohama Customs Office, he moved to the United States in 1899, working as a waiter to pay he way through high school. He also published a weekly business newsletter. In 1907, he graduated from Washington State University, continuing on to graduate school at the London School of Economics and Political Science, from his he obtained a doctorate in 1910.

After returning to Japan in 1911, Uehara worked as lecturer on political science at Meiji University,  Rikkyo University and at the forerunner of Tokyo Institute of Technology in Tokyo, teaching both comparative legal theory and constitutional law. He was a supporter of the theory of popular sovereignty, which was one of the underpinnings of the Taishō democracy movement. He was elected to a seat in the lower house of the Diet of Japan in the 1917 General Election under the Rikken Kokumintō party, and was subsequently reelected 13 times, holding the seat until World War II. A supporter of the reforms of Inukai Tsuyoshi, he later changed party affiliations to the Rikken Seiyūkai.

Uehara served as parliamentary councilor for the Ministry of Communications in 1924 under Prime Minister Katō Takaaki, and parliamentary councilor for the Ministry of Foreign Affairs in 1926 under Prime Minister Tanaka Giichi. In 1932–1936, Uehara was the Vice-Chair of the House of Representatives. In the 1939 schism of the Rikken Seiyuto, Uehara sided with the "orthodox" faction led by Ichirō Hatoyama.

Uehara took a critical stance against the formation of the Taisei Yokusankai, and in 1941 formed an anti-Yokusankai group with Hatoyama and Yukio Ozaki; however, the group was defeated in the 1942 General Election. During the war years, he worked in the budgetary committee of the Ministry of Foreign Affairs under Shigenori Tōgō and was noted for his anti-war stance, repeated stating that it was the job of the ministry to bring the war to an early conclusion.

After the end of World War II, Uehara helped form the Japan Liberal Party 1942–1948 together with Hatoyama and Hitoshi Ashida. In the first Yoshida administration he was appointed Minister without portfolio and subsequently Home Minister. Despite his liberal credentials, he was highly opposed to Article 9 of the new Constitution of Japan, which he felt to be incompatible with a sovereign nation.

In 1955, Uehara served as chairman of the Committee of Foreign Affairs for the House of Representatives.

Awards & Recognition
勲一等旭日大綬章 Grand Cordon of the Order of Rising Sun.

References
Kono,Masaru.  Japan’s Postwar Party Politics. Princeton University Press. (1997) 
Hunter, Janet.  A Concise Dictionary of Modern Japanese History . University of California Press (1994). 
Ramsdell, Daniel B. The Japanese Diet: Stability and Change in the Japanese House of Representative, 1890–1990. University Press of America (1992).

|-

|-

1877 births
1962 deaths
People from Nagano Prefecture
Washington State University alumni
Alumni of the University of London
Rikken Kokumintō politicians
20th-century Japanese politicians
Rikken Seiyūkai politicians
Democratic Party (Japan, 1954) politicians
Liberal Democratic Party (Japan) politicians
Liberal Party (Japan, 1945) politicians
Government ministers of Japan
Ministers of Home Affairs of Japan
Members of the House of Representatives (Japan)